The Indian Computer Emergency Response Team (CERT-IN or ICERT) is an office within the Ministry of Electronics and Information Technology of the Government of India. It is the nodal agency to deal with cyber security threats like hacking and phishing. It strengthens security-related defence of the Indian Internet domain.

Background 
CERT-IN was formed in 2004 by the Government of India under Information Technology Act, 2000 Section (70B) under the Ministry of Communications and Information Technology. CERT-IN has overlapping on responsibilities with other agencies such as National Critical Information Infrastructure Protection Centre (NCIIPC) which is under the National Technical Research Organisation (NTRO) that comes under Prime Minister's Office and National Disaster Management Authority (NDMA) which is under Ministry of Home Affairs..

Functions 
In December 2013, CERT-In reported there was a rise in the cyber attacks on Government organisations like banking and finance, oil and gas and emergency services. It issued a list of security guidelines to all critical departments. It liaisons with Office of National Cyber Security Coordinator, National Security Council and National Information Board in terms of the nation's cyber security and threats. As a nodal entity, India’s Computer Emergency Response Team (CERT-in) plays a crucial role under the Ministry of Electronics and Information Technology(MeitY).

September 2022, CERT-In hosted exercise 'Synergy'  in collaboration with Cyber Security Agency, Singapore. It had participation of 13 countries and was conducted as a part of International Counter Ransomware Initiative-Resilience Working Group.

Agreements 
A memorandum of understanding (MoU) was signed in May, 2016 between Indian Computer Emergency Response Team (CERT-In) and Ministry of Cabinet Office, UK. 

Earlier CERT-In signed MoUs with similar organisations in about seven countries - Korea, Canada, Australia, Malaysia, Singapore, Japan and Uzbekistan. 

Ministry of External Affairs has also signed MoU with Cyber Security as one of the areas of cooperation with Shanghai Cooperation Organisation. With the MoUs, participating countries can exchange technical information on Cyber attacks, response to cyber security incidents and find solutions to counter the cyber attacks. They can also exchange information on prevalent cyber security policies and best practices. The MoUs helps to strengthen cyber space of signing countries, capacity building and improving relationship between them.

Incidents and reports 
In March 2014, CERT-In reported a critical flaw in Android Jelly Bean's VPN implementation.

In July 2020, CERT-In had warned the Google Chrome users to immediately upgrade to the new Chrome browser version 84.0.4147.89. Multiple vulnerabilities that could allow access to hackers were reported.

In April 2021, issued a "high severity" rating advisory on the vulnerability detected on WhatsApp and WhatsApp Business for Android prior to v2.21.4.18 and WhatsApp and WhatsApp Business for iOS prior to v2.21.32.

According to the agency, India faced 11.5 million cyberattack incidents in 2021 including corporate attacks, and attacks on critical infrastructure and government agencies.

December 4 2022, CERT-In was called in to investigate the cyber attack on All India Institute of Medical Sciences (AIIMS), Delhi.

References

Government agencies of India
Government agencies established in 2004
2004 establishments in India

Cyber Security in India